Sergio Chianella (born 12 March 1968) is an Italian bobsledder. He competed in the four man event at the 1998 Winter Olympics.

References

External links
 

1968 births
Living people
Italian male bobsledders
Olympic bobsledders of Italy
Bobsledders at the 1998 Winter Olympics
People from Terni
Sportspeople from the Province of Terni